The Rock Engravings of Pobe-Mengao are located in the Pobe-Mengao Department of Burkina Faso.  Alongside the unique rock art, there exists man-made mounds as well as necropoles, millstones, and other archaeological artifacts such as metal tools.

World Heritage Status 
This site was added to the UNESCO World Heritage Tentative List on April 9, 1996 in the Cultural category.

See also
Rock Art

Notes

References 
Les gravures rupestres de Pobe-Mengao (#) - UNESCO World Heritage Centre Retrieved 2009-03-04.

Burkinabé culture